This is a list of famous French people of full or partial Maghrebi ancestry (having Jewish, Arabic or Berber ancestry from Algeria, Morocco or Tunisia).

Entertainment

 Fu'ad Aït Aattou, actor
Cédric Ben Abdallah (Ben), humorist, Algerian father and French mother
 Isabelle Adjani, actress, she holds the record for most César Awards for Best Actress with five awards. 
 Richard Anconina, actor
 Aure Atika (1970-), actress
 Jean-Pierre Bacri, actor
 Ramzy Bedia, actor
 Leïla Bekhti (1984–), actress, César Award for Most Promising Actress in 2011
 Catherine Belkhodja (1955–), artist, and her daughters Isild Le Besco and Maïwenn Le Besco, actress
 Yasmine Belmadi, actor
 Robert Benayoun, movie critic
 José Bénazéraf, film director, scriptwriter and producer
 Adel Bencherif, actor
 Yamina Benguigui, film director, Junior Minister for French Nationals Abroad and Relations with La Francophonie (French-speaking countries worldwide) at the Ministry of Foreign Affairs
Farouk Bermouga,  French actor, Algerian father and French mother
 Sami Bouajila, actor
 Rachida Brakni, actress
 Jean Benguigui,  actor
 Richard Berry, actor
 Dany Boon (1966–), French actor, Algerian father and French mother
 Michel Boujenah, humorist
 Paul Boujenah, director
 Nicolas Cazalé, actor, French father and Algerian mother
 Alain Chabat, comedian, film director, scriptwriter and producer
 David Charvet, actor
 Élie Chouraqui, film director, producer and scriptwriter
 Farid Chopel (1952–2008), actor
 Georges Cravenne,  founder of the César Award
 Abdel Raouf Dafri, scriptwriter
 Gérard Darmon, actor
 Jamel Debbouze, humorist
 Nadia Farès, actress
 Samir Guesmi, actor
 Nora Hamdi (1968–), film director
 Roger Hanin, actor filmmaker
 Hafsia Herzi, actress
 Agnès Jaoui, actress
 Saïda Jawad (1970-), actress
 Abdellatif Kechiche,  film director
 Salim Kechiouche, actor
 Yasmine Lafitte (née Hafida El Khabchi), pornstar
 Claude Lelouch, film director, producer, scriptwriter and actor
 Jalil Lespert, actor, French father and Algerian mother 
 Mabrouk El Mechri,  film director
 Kad Merad, actor
 Samy Naceri (1961–), actor
 Marie-José Nat, actress, Best Actress at the 1974 Cannes Film Festival for her performance in Les Violons du bal
 Mehdi Nebbou - French actor, Algerian father and German mother
 Safy Nebbou - French actor, Algerian father and German mother
 Polaire, dancer and actress
 Daniel Prévost (1939–), actor and comedian and his son Sören Prévost, comedian.
 Tahar Rahim (1981–), actor, César Award for Best Actor in 2010, European Film Award for Best Actor in 2009

 Sabrina Ouazani, actress
 Samy Seghir, actor
 Zinedine Soualem, actor
 Elisa Tovati, actress
 Saïd Taghmaoui, actor
 Jacques Villeret (1951–2005),  actor
 Michaël Youn, actor
 Ariel Zeitoun, film director, scriptwriter and producer
 Roschdy Zem (1965-), actor
 Malik Zidi (1975–), actor
 Claude Zidi, filmmaker

Music

 L'Algérino, rapper
 Franck Amsallem, pianist
 Chimène Badi, singer
 Alain Bashung (1947–), author, composer, performer and comedian
 Kader Belarbi, french choreographer, Algerian father and a French mother
 Amel Bent (1985-), singer
 Louis Bertignac (born to an Algerian Jewish father and a Spanish mother), musician
 Frida Boccara, singer
 Dany Brillant, singer
 Patrick Bruel, born Maurice Benguigui, singer
 Canardo, rapper
 Cut Killer, DJ
 Marcel Dadi, guitar player
 Étienne Daho, singer
 Demon One, rapper
Big Flo and oli, band singer, Argentine father and Algerian mother 
 DJ Abdel, DJ
 DJ Mam's, DJ, record producer
 DJ Mehdi, DJ
 Kenza Farah, singer
 Faudel, singer
 Jenifer, singer
 Adrien Gallo, musician (BB Brunes) and actor, French father and Algerian mother
 Félix Gray, singer
 David Guetta, DJ de house
 Gad Elmaleh, humorist
 Hakimakli, DJ
Marina Kaye, French singer, French father and Algerian mother 
 Kamelanc', rapper (aka Kamelancien) 
 Lââm, singer
 Lacrim, rapper
 La Fouine, rapper, singer, songwriter and actor
 Larusso, singer
 Sheryfa Luna, singer
 Melissa M, singer
 Enrico Macias, singer
 Didier Marouani, composer and musician
 Médine, rapper
 Mister You, rapper
 Marcel Mouloudji (1922–1994), poet and singer, and her daughter Annabelle
 Yael Naim, singer
 Najim, singer
 Nessbeal, rapper
 Juliette Noureddine (1962–), singer, author and composer
 Édith Piaf (1915–1963), singer. 
 Ridan, singer
Damien Saez - French singer, Spanish father and Algerian mother
 Sapho, singer
 Sinik, rapper
 Skalp, DJ, record producer, songwriter
 Souf, singer
 Martial Solal, Jazz pianist
 Jacqueline Taïeb, singer
 Tunisiano, rapper

Politics

 Leila Aïchi, Senator (2011-)
 Fadela Amara, Secretary of State (2007-2010)
 Kader Arif, Euro-MP (2004-2012), Junior Minister (ministre délégué), then Secretary of State (2012-2014), national MP (2014-) 
 David Assouline, Senator (2004-)
 Avi Assouly, national MP (2012-2014)
 Azouz Begag, writer, Junior Minister (2005-2007)
 Najat Vallaud-Belkacem, Minister (2012-)
 Malika Benarab-Attou, Euro-MP (2009-2014)
 Nora Berra, Secretary of State (2009-2012), Euro-MP (2012-2014)
 Yasmine Boudjenah, Euro-MP (1999-2004)
 Alima Boumediene-Thiery, Euro-MP (1999-2004), Senator (2004-2011)
 Kheira Bouziane, national MP (2012-)
 Pascal Cherki, national MP (2012-)
 Jean-François Copé (his mother's name is Monique Ghanassia), politician
 Gérald Moussa Darmanin (his grandfather's name is Moussa Ouakid), national MP (2012-), mayor of Tourcoing (2014-)
 Rachida Dati, Minister of Justice
 Karima Delli, Euro-MP (2009-)
 Julien Dray, politician
 Myriam El Khomri, Minister
 Samia Ghali, Senator (2008-)
 Jérôme Guedj, national MP (2014-)
 Meyer Habib, national MP (2013-)
 Razzy Hammadi, national MP (2012-)
 Roger Karoutchi, politician
 Bariza Khiari, Senator (2004-)
 Chaynesse Khirouni, national MP (2012-)
 Pierre Lellouche, politician
 Arnaud Montebourg (his mother's name is Leïla Ould Cadi), former minister
 Sami Nair, Euro-MP (1999-2004)
 Daphna Poznanski-Benhamou, national MP (2012-2013)
 Tokia Saïfi, Euro-MP, former Secretary of State
 Gérard Sebaoun, national MP (2012-)
 Dominique Strauss-Kahn (his mother's name is Jacqueline Fellus), politician
 Djida Tazdaït, Euro-MP (1989-1994)
 Nora Zaïdi, Euro-MP (1989-1994)
 Karim Zéribi, politician.

Sports

 Robert Abdesselam, tennis player
 Karim Benzema (1987–), football player
 Larbi Benboudaoud (1974-), judoka, silver medal in the 2000 Olympic Games in Sydney, Australia
 Djamel Bouras (1971-), judoka, gold medal in the 1996 Olympic Games in Atlanta, USA
 Pierre Darmon, tennis player
 Alphonse Halimi, boxer
 David Jemmali, football player
 Maxime Mermoz, French professional rugby union footballer, French father and Algerian mother 
 Alain Mimoun (1921–2013), Olympic marathon champion
 Samir Nasri (1987–), football player
 Zinedine Zidane, football player

Others
 Jacques Attali, economist
 Jeanne Benameur, writer, Tunisian father and Italian mother
 Paul Bénichou, historian
 Nina Bouraoui (1967–), writer 
 Jean Daniel BenSaïd (1920–), director of Le Nouvel Observateur
 Hélène Cixous, writer
 Annie Cohen-Solal, writer
 Claude Cohen-Tannoudji, physicist, Nobel Prize laurette (1997)
 Jacques Derrida, philosopher
 Jean-Pierre Elkabbach, journalist
 Pierre Fédida, psychoanalyst
 Denis Guedj, writer and mathematician
 Bernard-Henri Lévy, writer and philosopher
 Benjamin Stora, historian
 Pierre Assouline, journalist
 Gisèle Halimi, lawyer
 Serge Halimi, journalist
 Alain Mamou-Mani, producer
 Albert Memmi, writer
 Serge Moati, journalist and film director
 Leila Sebbar,  writer
 Maurice Taieb, geologist

See also
Maghrebis
Maghrebis in France

References

French people of North African descent
Maghrebis
Maghrebis